Fast & Furious is a media franchise centered on a series of action films.

The Fast and the Furious, Fast and Furious, and their variations, may also refer to:

Fast & Furious franchise
 The Fast and the Furious (2001 film), the first film in the series
 The Fast and the Furious (soundtrack), the soundtrack to the 2001 film
 The Fast and the Furious (2004 video game), a video game based on the 2001 film
 The Fast and the Furious (2006 video game), a video game based on The Fast and the Furious: Tokyo Drift
 Fast & Furious (2009 film), the fourth film in the series
 Fast & Furious (soundtrack), the soundtrack to the 2009 film
 Fast & Furious (score), the movie score soundtrack to the 2009 film

Other films
 Fast and Furious (1927 film), a silent film directed by Melville W. Brown
 Fast and Furious (1939 film), a film directed by Busby Berkeley
 The Fast and the Furious (1954 film), an American crime drama

Television
 Fast and Furry-ous, a 1949 Warner Bros. Looney Tunes cartoon
 "The Furious and the Fast", the seventh episode in the second season of the 2012 television series Dallas
 "The Fast and the Furious", a two-part episode airing in the third season of the 1981 television series B. J. and the Bear
 Supermodel Me (Season 3) or Supermodel Me: Fast & Furious, the third season of the Asian television series Supermodel Me

Other uses
 Operation Fast and Furious, a "gunwalking" operation by the Phoenix division of the United States Bureau of Alcohol, Tobacco, Firearms and Explosives

See also
 Tom and Jerry: The Fast and the Furry, a 2006 animated film